"Pranksta Rap" is the ninth episode of the sixteenth season of the American animated television series The Simpsons. It originally aired on the Fox network in the United States on February 13, 2005. It guest stars 50 Cent as himself, and Dana Gould as Barney Fife. Boots Riley of the rap group The Coup provided the score, although he did not write any lyrics.

Plot
After Santa's Little Helper swallows the TV remote while Homer watches the TV, he ends up changing the channel every time he barks. While the dog escapes and Homer chases him, Bart sees a commercial about a rap concert held by a hip hop artist named "Alcatraaaz". He asks for Homer's permission, he nonchalantly agrees when Bart says he will pay for the ticket himself. However, as he tries to leave for the concert, Marge is infuriated and forbids him from going; and Homer is forced to agree with her, to the point of singing a rap song with Marge about Bart's immaturity, much to his distress.

Since Bart paid for the ticket, he sneaks out of his bedroom window to attend the concert. During the concert, Alcatraaaz drops his microphone, which lands in Bart's hands, he therefore challenges him to a rap battle. Bart does an impromptu energetic rap, winning the battle, and gets a ride home from the concert with Alcatraaaz in his limo, meeting 50 Cent on the way. After being dropped off at home, he overhears Marge and Homer who are angry at him for disobeying them and going to the concert. To avoid his punishment, he fakes being kidnapped, writing a ransom note, and goes on the run. Homer and Marge are devastated and the next day, the "kidnapping" is covered by the media. Chief Wiggum vows to solve the case, but is made fun of by everyone due to his reputation as a bad cop. When Bart meets Milhouse and explains that he needs a place to stay until the heat dies down, Milhouse lets him squat at his dad Kirk's apartment.

As a joke, Bart calls the Simpson house impersonating the kidnapper, which is being recorded by Wiggum. When he hears how sad Marge is without him, Bart talks to her as himself and tries to reassure her, but is forced to cut the call short when the popcorn he is using begins to explode and Kirk arrives home. Wiggum, determined to redeem himself, deduces Bart's location from the popcorn brand from the phone call, and arrests Kirk for the "kidnapping", and is subsequently promoted to police commissioner. After seeing how badly Milhouse has been affected by his father's arrest, Bart confesses his hoax to Wiggum, who convinces him to keep it secret by showing him that Kirk is far better off in prison, due to having both regular meals and the admiration of numerous women as a result of being a convicted felon.

Lisa figures out the truth after discovering a sweater from the concert near Bart's treehouse, but upon showing Homer the evidence, he destroys it, having made a deal with Hollywood regarding the rights to Bart's story and having spent the money. Undeterred, Lisa and Principal Skinner travel to the home of Alcatraaaz, where they find footage of Bart at the concert. Moments later, Homer, Wiggum and Bart show up and try to convince Lisa to abandon her attempts at exposing them, on the basis that no one has been hurt over the lie, but Homer inadvertently knocks over Alcatraaaz's flat-screen TV. Alcatraaaz suggests they resolve the situation by throwing a pool party, to the delight of everyone but Lisa.

During the closing credits, Skinner inquires about a job in the hip hop business, but Alcatraaaz says he has already hired someone else for the job: Superintendent Chalmers, who, dressed as a rapper, orders Skinner to "step off... dawg." As Alcatraaaz's group laughs at him, Chalmers quietly confesses to Skinner that he needs the job as his wife is very sick.

Legacy

Andrew Martin of Prefix Mag named 50 Cent his eighth favorite musical guest on The Simpsons out of a list of ten.

A screencap from the episode showing a rapper wearing a chain necklace with the words "Thursday the 20th" has become an Internet meme, with the screencap getting circulated across the Internet on the twentieth day of a month if it is a Thursday.

References

External links

The Simpsons (season 16) episodes
2005 American television episodes